Theosodon is an extinct genus of litoptern mammal from the Early to Middle Miocene of South America.

Description 
 
Theosodon was long-legged with a long neck resembling modern llamas or guanacos.

It had a long neck and tapir-like, three-toed feet, and like other litopterns and modern horses, tapirs and rhinos, it bore its weight on its middle toes.

Extraordinarily, rather than having nostrils at the front of its head, Theosodon had its nostrils on the top of its snout, halfway between the forehead and the tip of the snout, and its nostrils pointed upwards rather than forwards, possibly as an adaptation for browsing on prickly vegetation.

History and species 
Theosodon has been known since the 19th century, and by 1910 seven species had been described within the genus, all from the early Miocene Santa Cruz Formation in Argentina. The name Theosodon means "god tooth". The first fossils were only dental remains, but it is unknown why this name was given. Though seven species had originally been described, the exact number of discovered species remains uncertain as it varies between different authors. There are either ten or seven species, and in 2014 Schmidt and Ferrero put forward that the genus needed a full taxonomic revision due to this issue.

"Theosodon" hystatus 
In 1931, fossils found in the late Miocene Arroyo Chasicó Formation were assigned to the genus under the name Theosodon hystatus. This was questioned in 1995, and in 2014 it was moved to the genus Paranauchenia due to similarities to the species Paranauchenia denticulata. This move was supported by phylogenetic analysis that showed the two species formed monophyletic clade.

"Theosodon" arozquetai 
In 2018 a new species of macraucheniid litoptern was described based on the partial remains of a skull and two metapodials. A phylogenetic analysis tentatively linked the species to Theosodon as a sister clade and it was named Theosodon arozquetai pending revision. It dated to the middle Miocene, about 13 million years ago, somewhat later than most other Theosodon species.

Classification 
 
Theosodon is in the subfamily Cramaucheniinae within the family Macraucheniidae. A phylogenetic analysis of the family in 2014 found that Cramaucheniinae is a paraphyletic group, and that Theosodon is a sister clade to the subfamily Macraucheniinae, the least primitive of the members of Cramaucheniinae.

Paleobiology 

Theosodon was a terrestrial and cursorial animal that may have lived in both forests and more open environments. Due to its size and its long neck, Theosodon was likely a high browser, stripping leaves off of trees and shrubs high off the ground. Theosodon had a slender jaw compared to many other litopterns, indicating its food was softer, such as dicotyledons. As its nostrils are upward-facing and at the centre of its head rather than the front, Theosodon may have used this adaptation to feed on thorny plants. Some modern animals such as giraffes feed on thorny plants, and their nostrils are also further back and face more upwards than forwards.

Other fossils were found in the Sarmiento Formation of Argentina, the Yecua Formation of Bolivia, the Honda Group of Colombia, the Chucal and Río Frías Formations of Chile and the Ipururo Formation of Peru.

References 

Macraucheniids
Miocene mammals of South America
Laventan
Colloncuran
Friasian
Santacrucian
Colhuehuapian
Neogene Argentina
Fossils of Argentina
Neogene Bolivia
Fossils of Bolivia
Neogene Chile
Fossils of Chile
Neogene Colombia
Fossils of Colombia
Honda Group, Colombia
Neogene Peru
Fossils of Peru
Fossil taxa described in 1887
Taxa named by Florentino Ameghino
Prehistoric placental genera
Golfo San Jorge Basin
Sarmiento Formation
Austral or Magallanes Basin
Santa Cruz Formation